Adolfo Sachsida (born 4 October 1972) is a Brazilian lawyer and economist.

He composed the economics team of Jair Bolsonaro until May 11, 2022, when he was appointed Minister of Mining and Energy.

Personal life and academic background 
Born in Londrina, in the north of Paraná, he graduated in Economics from the State University of Londrina (UEL) in 1994, and in 2015 graduated in Law from the Unified Education Center of Brasília (CEUB).

He holds a Master's and PhD in Economics from the University of Brasilia (UnB) and a postdoctoral degree from the University of Alabama in the United States.

References

External links 
 
 
 YouTube

|-

|-

|-

Living people
1972 births
21st-century Brazilian lawyers
Brazilian economists
21st-century Brazilian politicians
University of Brasília alumni
University of Alabama alumni
People from Londrina
Energy ministers of Brazil